The Quad Cities Rocket was a named passenger train of the Chicago, Rock Island and Pacific Railroad. It operated on a route between Chicago and Rock Island, Illinois. It was a remnant of one of the Rock Island's premier trains, the Rocky Mountain Rocket. That train's route had been cut back to Omaha in 1966; after a year without a name, it was renamed The Cornhusker. In 1970, the train took its final form when its western terminus was cut all the way back to Rock Island.

The railroad initially declined to hand passenger operations over to Amtrak and the Quad Cities continued to run as one of the company's two remaining routes (the other being the Peoria Rocket). The State of Illinois subsidized the cost of service, contributing $500,000 in 1977 to offset losses by the railroad (equivalent to $ in  adjusted for inflation). Trains ran until December 31, 1978 when the Rock Island ended its intercity passenger operations.

References

Named passenger trains of the United States
Passenger trains of the Chicago, Rock Island and Pacific Railroad
Railway services discontinued in 1978
Passenger rail transportation in Illinois